Edward Albert Stuart (12 May 1931 – 4 November 2014) was a South African professional footballer who played as a defender. He played 322 times in England for Wolverhampton Wanderers between 1951 and 1962, winning three league titles and the FA Cup. He also served Stoke City, Tranmere Rovers and Stockport County.

Career
Stuart began his professional career with Rangers of Johannesburg, where he won the South African Cup, before joining  English First Division side Wolverhampton Wanderers in January 1951. After spending time in the reserves, he made his senior debut on 15 April 1952, scoring in a 4–1 loss to Black Country rivals West Bromwich Albion. A visit to his homeland saw him contract a tropical disease that hospitalised him and put him out of action for over a year. He returned to the first team for the final months of the 1953–54 season that brought Wolves their first-ever league championship. He remained in the starting team over the remainder of the decade, adding two further league titles, and becoming club captain in 1959 following the retirement of Billy Wright.

In Summer 1962 Stuart joined Stoke City for £8,000. His first season with the club saw them win the Second Division title in 1962–63, and he remained for their return in the top flight. He played 30 matches for Stoke in 1963–64 as they consolidate their top-tier status. He moved to Tranmere Rovers for £4,000 in 1964, and later served Stockport County, where he won the Fourth Division title. He then had a brief spell in management as he became player-manager of non-league Worcester City in 1968, but left the club when he retired from playing in December 1971. After leaving the game, he ran a string of hairdressing salons around the Wolverhampton area.

Stuart died on 4 November 2014 in Wrexham, Wales aged 83 following a long illness.

Career statistics
Source:
 

A.  The "Other" column constitutes appearances and goals in the FA Charity Shield and European Cup.

Honours
 Wolverhampton Wanderers
 Football League First Division champions: 1953–54, 1957–58, 1958–59
 FA Cup winner: 1960

 Stoke City
 Football League Second Division champions: 1962–63

 Stockport County
 Football League Fourth Division champions: 1966–67

References

External links
 

1931 births
2014 deaths
People from Middelburg, Eastern Cape
Association football defenders
Expatriate footballers in England
South African emigrants to the United Kingdom
South African soccer managers
South African soccer players
Stockport County F.C. players
Stoke City F.C. players
English Football League players
Tranmere Rovers F.C. players
Wolverhampton Wanderers F.C. players
Worcester City F.C. managers
Worcester City F.C. players
Rangers F.C. (South Africa) players
Soccer players from the Eastern Cape